Aleksandr Shchipkov may refer to:

 Aleksandr Shchipkov (born 1981), Russian association football player
 Aleksandr Shchipkov (born 1957), Russian sociologist of religion